Scott Pfeifer (born January 5, 1977 in St. Albert, Alberta) is a Canadian curler from Sherwood Park, Alberta, Canada who plays out of the St. Albert Curling Club in St. Albert. He was the long-time second for the Randy Ferbey rink from 1998 to 2010, winning four Briers and three World championships with the team. He later served as the alternate for the Kevin Koe rink with whom he won a Brier and world championship,  and represented Canada at the 2018 Winter Olympics.

Pfeifer won the 1994 Canadian Junior Curling Championships and 1994 World Junior Curling Championships as a second for Colin Davison. At the 1997 Canadian Juniors Pfeifer threw fourth stones for Ryan Keane and would win his second national junior championship. He finished third at the '97 World Junior Curling Championships and became the '98 Shamrock Poor Boy champion. By 1999, he had joined the Randy Ferbey team, for whom he played second. As a member of Team Ferbey, Pfeifer won Briers in 2001, 2002, 2003 and 2005 and World championships in 2002, 2003 and 2005.

For the 2010–11 and 2011–12 curling season, Pfeifer's curling career was put on hiatus. Pfeifer returned to competitive curling for the 2012–13 season, playing second for Jamie King for two more seasons.

Pfeifer won the 2016 Tim Hortons Brier as the alternate for Team Alberta (skipped by Kevin Koe) and won the 2016 World Men's Curling Championship with the team. They also won the 2017 Canadian Olympic Curling Trials and represented Canada at the 2018 Winter Olympics where they lost the bronze medal game to Switzerland's Peter de Cruz.

Pfeifer is currently a performance consultant for Curling Canada

Personal life
Pfeifer is a business owner Ventures North Financial Group. He is married and has two children.

References

External links

Curlers from Alberta
1977 births
Brier champions
Living people
Sportspeople from Sherwood Park
Sportspeople from St. Albert, Alberta
World curling champions
Canadian male curlers
Continental Cup of Curling participants
Curlers at the 2018 Winter Olympics
Olympic curlers of Canada
Canadian curling coaches
Canada Cup (curling) participants